Berthe Cerny (born Françoise Berthe-Hélène-Lucie de Choudens; 31 January 1868 – 27 March 1940) was a French actress, known as an elegant blonde beauty. She had a brilliant career, interpreting both classical and contemporary roles.
She had several affairs, including with the politicians Aristide Briand and Paul Reynaud, and had two illegitimate sons by other lovers.
She joined the Comédie-Française in 1906 and became a sociétaire in 1909.

Early career 

Françoise Berthe-Hélène-Lucie de Choudens was born on 31 January 1868 in Paris.
At a very young age she was a student of Gustave Worms at the Conservatoire de Paris.
She graduated in 1885 with a first prize in acting.
In 1886 she had a child, Jacques Robert de Choudens (1887–1915), by an unknown father.
She played under the stage name Berthe Cerny at the Théâtre de l'Odéon, then the Théâtre du Vaudeville, then other venues, and for twenty years pursued a brilliant career on the boulevards.
She played notable roles in plays by Paul Hervieu, Marcel Prévost and Georges de Porto-Riche.

Les Annales du Théâtre et de la Musique for 1893 reported three plays that featured Berthe Cerny.
In January she appeared at the Théâtre du Gymnase Marie Bell in Je dîne chez ma mère by Adrien Decourcelle.
The critic wrote, "Mlle. Berthe Cerny, who had just had a great success in Brussels, had taken over Sophie Arnould's role with infinite charm and grace."
In April she appeared again at the Théâtre du Gymnase Marie Bell as Maman Clémentine in the Homme à l'oreille cassée by Pierre Decourcelle and Antony Mars, after the novel by Edmond About.
She appeared at the Théâtre du Palais-Royal in November as Etiennette in the romantic comedy Leurs Gigolettes by Henri Meilhac and Albert de Saint-Albin.
The critic said, "Berthe Cerny is fine and perverse; she shows us, moreover, with laudable disinterest, two exquisitely molded legs in pretty stockings of black silk."

In 1895 Alexandre Dumas, fils repeated the stale idea that actresses must be immoral, saying the "feverish work, the quest for feigned emotions, the thirst for applause, the joys of triumph ... raise their bodies to a temperature they must maintain in real life."
Berthe Cerny was among those who contradicted him in the pages of Le Temps, saying that a well-behaved but talented actress could easily portray vice.

Wealthy lovers

In 1897 Berthe Cerny formed a relationship with Raoul William Johnston (1870–1915), a polytechnician and mining engineer, administrator of the Mines d'Albi.
Johnston was the wealthy owner of the Beaucaillou Bordeaux vineyards.
She had a child by him, François Johnston (1898–1936).
She was given a beautiful house in Saint-Cloud by her lover.

Berthe began a relationship with the politician Aristide Briand in 1907.
When Briand fell for her she was a blonde beauty, charming and elegant in the long dresses and high hats of the period.
She had natural assurance and was financially secure due to her "bon ami" Johnston.
By 1910 the former socialist's politics had moved to the right due to her influence.
He had taken a liking to visiting salons, where he met writers, artists and women of high society.
In 1913 Briand met Princess Marie Bonaparte, wife of Prince George of Greece.
For a long time she refused Briand's advances, since she did not want to share him with Berthe.
The rupture finally came in April 1916, when Berthe wrote to Briand telling him not to visit her again, and to let her gently forget him.

Later Berthe Cerny formed a relationship with the politician Paul Reynaud.

Comédie-Française
In 1906 Berthe Cerny joined the Comédie-Française at the request of Maurice Donnay, for whom she created Paraître.
She became a sociétaire in 1909.
She dominated the classical repertoire in roles such as Célimène in Molière's The Misanthrope, Suzanne in Pierre Beaumarchais's The Marriage of Figaro and Alcmene in Moliere's Amphitryon.
She also starred in Henry Becque's La Parisienne.
Just before and after World War I (1914–18) Berthe Cerny performed in two plays by Pierre de Marivaux in which Louis Jouvet said she relived the spirit of Italian theatre.
She played the Comtesse in Marivaux's Le Legs before the war, giving a perfect interpretation of the role.
She played Araminte in Marivaux's Les Fausses Confidences in April 1918. 
The play was a success, and received good reviews from most critics.

In the postwar period she was able to relax, playing only 20 times a year for the Comédie-Française.
She appeared in the 1922 documentary film Molière, sa vie, son oeuvre directed by Jacques de Féraudy.
In modern theater she gave excellent performances as heroines in the plays of Paul Géraldy, François de Curel and Henry Bataille, including the baronne Irène in Bataille's Maman Colibri.
She retired in 1930 and was at once named an honorary member of the Comédie-Française.
She died on 27 March 1940 in Paris, and was buried in the Cimetière d'Auteuil.

Performances

A sample of plays in which Berthe Cerny performed:

Notes

Sources

1868 births
1940 deaths
19th-century French actresses
French stage actresses
20th-century French actresses
Sociétaires of the Comédie-Française